Aqua Augusta may refer to two Roman aqueducts:
 Aqua Augusta (Naples) supplying the Bay of Naples
 Aqua Augusta (Rome) supplying Rome

nl:Aqua Augusta